Crowell is a city in Foard County, Texas, United States. It serves as the county seat, and the population was 948 at the 2010 census, down from 1,141 at the 2000 census.

Geography

Crowell is located near the center of Foard County at  (33.985838, –99.724430). U.S. Route 70 passes through the city as Commerce Street, leading east  to Vernon and west  to Paducah. Texas State Highway 6 (Main Street) crosses US 70 in the center of Crowell, leading north  to Quanah and south  to Benjamin.

The terrain is varied, but mostly level with rolling hills. Soil varies from slightly sandy loam to mostly sandy. Soil and meteorological conditions make the area suitable for growing wheat, cotton, and hay crops (alfalfa and cane). Little of the area immediately around Crowell has underground water in amounts suitable for irrigation. The majority of the area immediately east of Crowell is dedicated to cultivated crops. The majority of the area immediately west of Crowell is dedicated to raising beef cattle.

Demographics

2020 census

As of the 2020 United States census, there were 769 people, 298 households, and 169 families residing in the city.

2000 census
As of the census of 2000,  1,141 people, 465 households, and 292 families were residing in the city. The population density was 604.6 people/sq mi (233.1/km2). The 568 housing units  averaged 301.0/sq mi (116.0/km2). The racial makeup of the city was 83.26% White, 3.07% African American, 0.70% Native American, 11.13% from other races, and 1.84% from two or more races. Hispanics or Latinos of any race were 17.62% of the population.

Of the 465 households, 29.7% had children under 18 living with them, 50.3% were married couples living together, 10.3% had a female householder with no husband present, and 37.0% were not families. About 34.4% of all households were made up of individuals, and 21.7% had someone living alone who was 65 or older. The average household size was 2.36, and the average family size was 3.08.

In the city, the age distribution was 26.8% under 18, 5.9% from 18 to 24, 21.9% from 25 to 44, 22.3% from 45 to 64, and 23.0% who were 65  or older. The median age was 40 years. For every 100 females, there were 82.9 males. For every 100 females age 18 and over, there were 79.6 males.

The median income for a household in the city was $22,214, and for a family was $30,667. Males had a median income of $21,141 versus $16,184 for females. The per capita income for the city was $12,965. About 11.4% of families and 16.4% of the population were below the poverty line, including 17.1% of those under age 18 and 19.6% of those age 65 or over.

History
Located between the Pease River to the north and the North Wichita River to the south, the area has long been home to a variety of hardy animal and plant species. Native grasses tend to be hardy and drought-tolerant. Tree varieties include bush juniper, mesquite, hackberry, mulberry, and pecan, in addition to several imports that thrive in the warm, semiarid conditions. Native animals species include coyotes, squirrels, badgers, raccoons, and foxes. Deer have also become plentiful in recent decades, as have feral pigs. Bird species include quail, dove, and several types of migratory waterfowl. Crowell is on the migration path of the monarch butterfly.

Crowell is only a few miles from the recapture location of Cynthia Ann Parker. Known locally as the Pease River battleground, Cynthia Ann, captured as a child by raiding Indians, was recaptured here as an adult by U.S. soldiers. Cynthia Ann was the mother of Quanah Parker, considered the last great chief of the Comanche.

Though few notables and celebrities call Crowell home, some worth mentioning remain. Former football star Dick Todd set long-standing records as a running back for Texas A&M University. He then went on to play for, and eventually coach, the Washington Redskins. Todd's son, Denny, died as a teenager from injuries sustained on the football field. His memory is honored each year with an award in his name. The award is presented to the football team member who shows the greatest personal contribution to the team, both on and off the field.

The remote, rural location minimizes light pollution, making for an excellent view of the night sky. As a result, Crowell is home to Comanche Springs Astronomy Campus, a  observatory built by the Three Rivers Foundation for the Arts and Sciences. The economy is almost solely agrarian. Beef cattle, wheat, and cotton are the primary sources of income and employment. Hunting leases are quickly becoming a notable contributor to the local economy. The single manufacturing industry is a cap factory. Formerly owned by the DeLong company, the factory is now owned by a group of local investors.

Though a small, rural community, Crowell still has interests. In addition to the observatory,  a museum was built by the Foard County Historical Society. Housed in the former firehouse, the museum boasts artifacts from the history of Crowell and environs. Most notable is the one-of-a-kind scale town. The diorama-style exhibits are designed to reflect the historically notable businesses in city history. Just across the street from the Firehall Museum is the Farm Implement Museum.

In 2009, the Zion Lutheran Cemetery was named an historic Texas cemetery by the Texas Historical Commission. The cemetery is located just west of the Zion Lutheran Church near the intersection of Farm to Market Road 2073 and FM 2074 several miles off U.S. Highway 70 between Lockett and Crowell.

Education
The city is served by the Crowell Independent School District and home to the Crowell High School Wildcats.

Climate
According to the Köppen climate classification, Crowell has a semiarid climate, BSk on climate maps.

References

External links

City of Crowell unofficial website
Crowell ISD
Crowell Community Page 

Cities in Texas
Cities in Foard County, Texas
County seats in Texas